Udara selma is a species of butterfly of the family Lycaenidae. It is found in South-east Asia.

Subspecies
U. s. selma (Borneo)
U. s. cerima (Corbet, 1937) (Assam, Burma, Thailand)
U. s. elothales (Fruhstorfer, 1910) (Sumatra)
U. s. mindanensis Eliot and Kawazoé, 1983 (Philippines: Mindanao)
U. s. tanarata (Corbet, 1895) (Malaysia)

References

 , 1983. Blue butterflies of the Lycaenopsis group: 1-309, 6 pls. London

Butterflies described in 1895
Udara
Butterflies of Borneo
Butterflies of Asia